Bhadohi Lok Sabha constituency is one of the 80 Lok Sabha (parliamentary) constituencies in Uttar Pradesh state in northern India. This constituency came into existence in 2008 as a part of the implementation of delimitation of parliamentary constituencies based on the recommendations of the Delimitation Commission of India constituted in 2002.

Assembly segments
Presently, Bhadohi Lok Sabha constituency comprises five Vidhan Sabha (legislative assembly) segments. These are:

Members of Parliament

Election results

See also
 Sant Ravidas Nagar district
 Mirzapur Lok Sabha constituency
 Phulpur Lok Sabha constituency
 List of Constituencies of the Lok Sabha

Notes

External links

Lok Sabha constituencies in Uttar Pradesh
Bhadohi district